Milerock is a Guyanese football club based in Linden, competing in the Guyana National Football League, the top tier of Guyanese football. The club has a local rivalry with fellow Linden-based club, Topp XX.

Notable players

 Clive Nobrega

Football clubs in Guyana
1972 establishments in Guyana